Taku Inlet is an inlet located in the U.S. state of Alaska.

Geography

Taku Inlet is suitable for use only for shallow draft river boats, as it is shallow in depth and is a “cul-de-sac”. Taku Glacier is located at the head of this inlet. Since 1890, the glacier  had moved by some   into the Taku Inlet. As a result of the rapid movement of the glacier, silting has occurred at the head of the inlet. A complete preliminary navigational chart, to a scale of 1:10,000, has been prepared by field surveys, to facilitate interested navigators to operate ships to view the glaciers. Scow Cove, Sunny Cove, Annex Peak, and Annex Lakes are some of its geographical features on its western side. On the eastern side of the inlet is Turner Lake, Bart Lake and Lake Dorothy.

Norris, Taku, Hole-in–the-Wall, Twin and Tulsequah glaciers emerge out on the southeastern side and flow into the trench of the Taku Inlet and Taku River. Two ice-streams join here to form a fan slope, ending in a terminal moraine. The sandy level of the moraine is cut by several watercourses; crimson epilobium blanket the beds of moraine.

Fauna

Many bears, wolves, and killer whales are found in the area. Halibut and crabs are commercially harvested in Taku Inlet.

References

Inlets of Alaska
Bodies of water of Juneau, Alaska